The black-necked whipsnake (Demansia calodera) is a species of venomous snake in the family Elapidae. It is endemic to Western Australia. It can reach   in snout–vent length.

References

Demansia
Endemic fauna of Australia
Snakes of Australia
Reptiles of Western Australia
Reptiles described in 1978
Taxa named by Glen Milton Storr